All Heaven Broke Loose is the third album by Bill Bruford's Earthworks, featuring Django Bates, Iain Ballamy and Tim Harries. It was released on EG Records in 1991. It was co-produced by experimental guitarist David Torn, with whom Bruford had played extensively in the 1980s (and would go on to do again in Bruford Levin Upper Extremities in 1998-2000.

Reception

AllMusic awarded the album with 4.5 stars and its review by Scott Yanow states: "Full of unpredictability, subtle mood changes, touches of eccentric funk and a surprisingly creative use of electronic rhythms here and there, Bruford's band plays intense but sometimes melancholy and introspective music. Recommended".

The authors of The Penguin Guide to Jazz Recordings called Bates' contribution to "Candles Still Flicker in Romania's Dark" "exceptional by any standard."

Josef Woodard of Entertainment Weekly called the album "evocative," and wrote: "Earthworks play up their jazz associations, but the lack of either traditional song structures or extended solos suggests a careful balance of tradition and mischief... Heard from start to finish, the album tells an engaging, abstract story, steeped in the spirit of jazz — if not the letter."

Writing for All About Jazz, John Kelman commented: "All Heaven Broke Loose is arguably Earthworks Mark I's most fully-realized studio release, even as it moves towards a more abstract aesthetic. Still, despite its off-kilter approach to tunes that avoid conventional form, Bruford's intrinsic time sense keeps things grounded throughout."

A reviewer for Jazz Journal remarked: "the integrative aspect of the four men is remarkable and it is frequently difficult to be clear about which of them is playing what. No matter. There is some richly rewarding music to enjoy – if you are prepared to be open-minded about the boundaries of jazz. Perhaps there are none, anyway."

Track listing 
 "Hotel Splendour" (Iain Ballamy, Django Bates, Bill Bruford) – 4:42 
 "Forget-Me-Not" (Ballamy, Bates) – 8:25
 "Candles Still Flicker in Romania's Dark" (Bates) – 4:35
 "Pigalle" (Bates, Bruford) – 6:32
 "Temple of the Winds" (Ballamy, Bruford, Tim Harries) – 5:02
 "Nerve" (Ballamy, Bates, Bruford) – 6:07
 "Splashing Out" (Ballamy, Bates) – 5:25
 "All Heaven Broke Loose:1. Psalm, 2. Old Song" (Ballamy, Bates, Bruford) – 9:20Additional tracks (from Summerfold CD reissue, remastered):
 "Libreville" (Ballamy, Bates, Bruford) - 7:54
 "Pilgrim's Way" (Ballamy, Bruford) - 8:01

Personnel 
 Bill Bruford – electronic, acoustic and chordal drums 
 Django Bates – keyboards, E peck horn, trumpet
 Iain Ballamy – saxophones 
 Tim Harries – acoustic and electric bass

References 

Bill Bruford albums
Earthworks (band) albums
1991 albums
E.G. Records albums
Albums produced by David Torn